Bothrops venezuelensis, or the Venezuelan lancehead, is a species of venomous snake in the  family Viperidae. It is endemic to South America.

Toxicology
There is not much known about the dangerousness of the venom to humans, but potentially lethal envenoming is possible. The venom of B. venezuelensis contains procoagulants, possibly also myotoxins and cytotoxic substances. This species is associated with a high snakebite-related morbidity and mortality in Venezuela, there's a report of a patient bitten by a juvenile, he had local swelling, severe pain, endothelial damage, excessive fibrinolysis, and incoagulable blood within 1.5 hours after the bite. He also had AKI with macroscopic hematuria, fluid overload resulted in pulmonary edema, requiring intermittent ventilation and diuretic treatment with furosemide.

Geographic range
It is found in Colombia and northern Venezuela.

The type locality is " 'Boca de Tigre', Serranía de El Avila, Distrito Federal, Venezuela ".

References

Further reading
 Sandner-Montilla, Fernando. 1952. Serpientes Bothrops de Venezuela. Monografias Cientificas del Instituto de Terapeutica Experimental de los Laboratorios "Veros" LTDA. 9 (21): 5 pp. (unnumbered).

External links

venezuelensis
Snakes of South America
Reptiles of Colombia
Reptiles of Venezuela
Reptiles described in 1952